Iskra was a 1900–1905 communist newspaper. The word means "spark" in many Slavic languages.

Iskra may also refer to:

People 
Iskra Babich (1932–2001), Soviet film director and screenwriter
Iskra Dimitrova (born 1965), Macedonian artist
Iskra Lawrence (born 1990), English model
Iskra Mihaylova (born 1957), Bulgarian politician
Iskra Velinova (born 1953), Bulgarian rower

Places 
İskra, former name of Aşağı Kəsəmən, Azerbaijan
Iskra, Kuyavian-Pomeranian Voivodeship (north-central Poland)
Iskra, Parvomay village in Plovdiv region, Bulgaria
Iskra, Kardzhali Province, Bulgaria
Iskra, Chüy, a village in Chüy District, Kyrgyzstan
Iskra, Orenburg Oblast, village in Sakmarsky District, Orenburg Oblast, Russia
Iskra, Kursky District, Kursk Oblast, settlement in Kursky District, Kursk Oblast, Russia

Products 
ISKRA lasers, used for laser fusion experiments at VNIIEF Russia
Iskra-1030, a Soviet personal computer, other Iskras in list of Soviet computer systems
, 1960–1963 Soviet camera
PZL TS-11 Iskra, a Polish jet aircraft

Sports teams 
NK Iskra Bugojno, a football club in Bosnia and Herzegovina
FK Iskra Danilovgrad, a football club from Montenegro
ISKRA, volleyball club based in Odintsovo, Moscow Oblast, Russia
FC Iskra-Stal, a football club from Moldova.

Other 
Iskra (company), an electronic equipment manufacturer in Yugoslavia, now broken up into many parts, some with "Iskra" in the name
Iskra (Egyptian communist organisation)
Iskra (film), a 2017 Montenegrin film
Iskra (magazine), a 19th-century Russian satirical weekly
Iskra 1903, Iskra 1904 and Iskra 1912, free jazz groups of Paul Rutherford
Operation Iskra

See also
 Iskar (disambiguation)